Mavis Nduchwa, also known as Rewana Nduchwa (28 August 1982 – 13 August 2021), was the founder and CEO of the agribusiness Chabana farms, which also trades as Kalahari Honey. She is a motswana entrepreneur, who is one of the 2020 Jack Ma foundation top 50 Africa Business Heroes finalist.

Background and education  
Mavis Nduchwa was born in 1983, in Francistown, Botswana, and holds a bachelor's degree in real estate and hospitality management.

Career 
Nduchwa is the founder and CEO of Chabana farms, which trades as Kalahari Honey. Kalahari honey business model revolves around solving the human elephant conflict in Botswana. Her company identifies farmers to set up beehives as a way of mitigating crop damage. Through her business model she seeks to study ways of increasing the bee populations. Her social enterprise Kalahari Honey supplies beehives to women in rural areas as a means of protecting their farmlands from elephants.

Nduchwa is the 2020 Women Empower UN SDG challenge winner for Sub- Saharan Africa, a global award for women in business and 2019 AFRINIC (African Network Information Center) fellow. In 2017 she was among the Tony Elumelu Foundation winners, where she was selected for the Mandela Washington Fellow initiative, Young African Leaders Initiative (YALI) fellow.

Nduchwa holds the 2019 Woman Owned Business of the Year Botswana (Grant Thornton), Most Outstanding African Entrepreneur Award 2018 (Tony Elumelu Foundation) and Botswana Innovation Award 2019  In 2017 she was selected for the Tony Elumelu Entrepreneurship Program in which African business are selected based on merit and receive entrepreneurship training and a $5000 grant. In 2019, Nduchwa was featured in the Food Chain Global Champion as a guest judge with Samin Nosrat, Gaggan Anand, Marion Nestle and Arnold Kreilhuber.

References

1983 births
Living people